Holarchaea novaeseelandiae is one of only two described species in the spider genus Holarchaea, and is endemic to New Zealand.

Description
This spider is very small, less than 1.5 millimetres long. It is shiny black, brown, olive or buff in colour. The head region is clearly demarcated, has eight eyes and a few setae.

Distribution and habitat
This spider occurs only in the forests of New Zealand. It lives in humid environments and has been found on moss, plant litter and ferns.

References

Anapidae
Spiders of New Zealand
Spiders described in 1949